
AD 77 (LXXVII) was a common year starting on Wednesday (link will display the full calendar) of the Julian calendar. At the time, it was known as the Year of the Consulship of Vespasian and Titus (or, less frequently, year 830 Ab urbe condita). The denomination AD 77 for this year has been used since the early medieval period, when the Anno Domini calendar era became the prevalent method in Europe for naming years.

Events

By place

Roman Empire 
 Gnaeus Julius Agricola is named governor of Britannia, a post he occupies until AD 84. He extends the Roman influence to the mouth of the River Clyde (Scotland), and builds fortifications. 
 Agricola subdues the Ordovices in Wales, and pursues the remnants of the tribe to Anglesey, the holy island of the Druids. 
 The Caledonian tribes in Scotland form a confederacy of 30,000 warriors, under the leadership of Calgacus.
 Winter – Agricola conquers Anglesey, and disperses his army to their winter quarters.

Asia 
 King Giru of Baekje succeeds to the throne of Baekje in the Korean Peninsula.

By topic

Arts and sciences 
 Pliny the Elder publishes the first ten books of Naturalis Historia.
 The Romans develop a simple method of distillation.

Deaths 
 Daru of Baekje, Korean king

References 

0077

als:70er#Johr 77